Juan Diego Academy is a private, Catholic school in Mission, Texas, United States. The school is located in the Roman Catholic Diocese of Brownsville.

History
Juan Diego Academy was founded in 2011 after several years of planning and fundraising. The original school buildings were the site of St. Joseph and St. Peter Seminary. In 2018, the United States government announced its intentions to acquire land near the school from the Brownsville Diocese through eminent domain in order to build additional border fencing.

References

External links
 Juan Diego Academy website
 Roman Catholic Diocese of Brownsville

Catholic secondary schools in Texas
High schools in Hidalgo County, Texas
Educational institutions established in 2011
2011 establishments in Texas